The San Gabriel Valley League is a high school athletic league that is part of the CIF Southern Section. Members are located in southeastern Los Angeles County. The San Gabriel Valley is regarded to be north of the San Rafael Hills, some ten miles north of Downey High School, the farthest north of the schools in this league.

Members
 Dominguez High School
 Downey High School
 Gahr High School
 Lynwood High School
 Paramount High School
 Warren High School

In the past Bellflower and Cerritos were members of the league.

References

CIF Southern Section leagues